Claudia Wunderlich (born 16 February 1956) is a former East German handball player who competed in the 1980 Summer Olympics.

In 1980 she won the bronze medal with the East German team. She played four matches and scored four goals.

External links
profile

1956 births
Living people
People from Halberstadt
People from Bezirk Magdeburg
German female handball players
Sportspeople from Saxony-Anhalt
Olympic handball players of East Germany
Handball players at the 1980 Summer Olympics
Olympic bronze medalists for East Germany
Olympic medalists in handball
Medalists at the 1980 Summer Olympics
Recipients of the Patriotic Order of Merit in silver
20th-century German women